Vadama meaning "Northerners" are a sub-sect of the Iyer community of Tamil Brahmins. While some believe that their name is an indication of the fact that they were the most recent Brahmin migrants to the Tamil country others interpret the usage of the term "Vadama" as a reference to their strict adherence to the Sanskrit language and Vedic rituals which are of northerly origin.

Etymology of the term
The term Vadama may have originated from the Tamil term 'Vadakku' meaning North, indicating the Northern origin of the Vadama Brahmins. This claim is supported by the fact that, unlike other subsects of Iyers, some Vadama pay oblations in their daily Sandhyavandanam to the river Narmada in Central India. However, what is not certain is whether 'North' refers to northern Tamil Nadu/Southern Deccan, or regions farther north. Other scholars are of the opinion that rather than the superficial indication of a northern origin for the people, the term "vadama" would rather refer to proficiency in Sanskrit and Vedic ritual, generally associated with the north prior to the first millennium A. D.

Sub-categories

Vadamas are further sub-divided into five categories

  Vadadesa Vadama (Vadamas of the northern country)
 Choladesa Vadama(Vadamas of the Chola country)
 Sabhaiyar(member of the conference (Sabha))
 Injee and
 Thummagunta Dravida.

Intermarriage with other Iyer sects has been increasing in recent times, while earlier, most marriages were arranged only within the same subsect of Vadama. Such a degree of exclusion has become rather uncommon now. Exceptions did exist, such as the marriage of Kurratalwan's sons(Considered to be Vadama followers of Sri Vaishnavism), which took place outside the Vadama fold.

History

Some historians hold that all Brahmins who migrated to the far-south during and after the age of the Gupta Emperors, came to be classified as Vadama.

First millennium A.D.

There is  a  perception that some Kashmir-linked Vadama settled in Tirunelveli between 750 and 800 AD. An interesting fact corroborating this migration may be had from the treatise called Natyashastra written by Bharata Muni, held by some to have been from Kashmir and by others to be from the south, formed the basis of the dance-form Bharatanatyam which is particularly associated with Tamil Nadu. Art Historians such as Vasundhara Filliozat claim that there are inscriptional evidences to prove the continuous migration of teachers from Kashmir to South. Such scholars also state that some other South Indian Saivaite and Tantric traditions were also introduced by teachers from Kashmir.

It appears that the Sabhaiyar group of the Vadama, were present in the Chola Empire in the 9th century, since the grant of the "entire village of Chirri[dai]yarru excluding the kani of Samgappadi-kilan was made to the temple of Mahadeva at Tirumalpperu as a tax-free devadana in the 21st year [892 A.D.] of the reign of Chola Aditya I and the administration of the charity was entrusted to the sabhaiyar of Puduppakkam in Purisanadu".

Second millennium

14th and 15th centuries

Instability prevailed in Peninsular India in the aftermath of the defeat of the Yadavas of Deogiri and Kakatiyas of Warangal in the early 14th century by the Tughlaqs. In response to the Moslem irruptions the Kingdom of Vijayanagar was founded in 1336, and came to be locked in an existential struggle with the Bahmani Sultanate from 1347 to 1490, when the Moslem state broke up. This early period was marked by much strife, especially in the jihads of Taj ud-Din Firuz Shah (1397–1422) and his brother Ahmad Shah I Wali (1422–1435), when thousands of Hindus, especially Brahmins, were enslaved and temples of the northern Deccan desecrated. The oppression was also felt in the eastern peninsula as far as the Gajapati Kingdom where, for instance in 1478, Muhammad Shah III Lashkari (1463–1482) demolished the Great Temple of Kondavidu and was acclaimed as a ghazi, for personally decapitating all the Brahmins. Such excesses induced Brahmins to seek refuge in the realms of Vijayanagar, where many were appointed karnams (bailiffs) in preference to other castes, from the reign of Harihara I (1336–1357) onward.

Early 16th century

After the division of the Bahmani Sultanate in 1490, into the Sultanates of Bijapur, Golconda, Ahmadnagar and Berar, the armies of Vijayanagar were successful in fending of invasions and restricting the Sultanates to Central India, especially in the reign of Krishnadeva Raya (1509–1529), who also began the practice of appointing Brahmins commanders of strategically important forts.

16th and 17th centuries

Relative peace prevailed until the Battle of Talikota, in 1565, when Rama Raya of Vijayanagar was killed and the capital city razed to the ground. The land, in addition to being plundered by the combined armies of the Sultanates, came to be oppressed by renegade polygars and bandits whose rise commenced with the destruction of the central power. The Mogul invasion of Peninsular India and the depredations of the Deccan by the Mahrattas under Shivaji also began early in the 17th century.

A combination of these belligerent powers and the desolation they helped create appears to have made the relative peace offered in the far south of the country under the Hindu kings of Travancore, Madurai, Tanjore and Mysore, far more desirable and induced many Hindus to migrate there. A fact supporting this idea, we have from English chroniclers in the 17th century, who state that their procurement of goods along the Western Concan and Canara coasts, suffered severely after the Mogul invasions and the mass depopulation of the peninsula they caused. Another statement often encountered in their annals is that the economic growth of the factory at Fort St. George, Madras was in a large measure attributable to the fact that many people chose to settle there to escape the chaotic conditions farther north. When we consider, in conjunction with these two facts, Fort St. George's position as a newly established, well-fortified and growing settlement in Aurangzeb's time, and therefore a secure refuge, a mass exodus southwards seems to have occurred in the period in question.

The relatives and family members of C. P. Ramaswami Iyer, a Vadadesa Vadama, believed that they were descended from  Brahmins of the Desh region of Maharashtra and Madhya Pradesh who migrated to Chittoor district of Andhra Pradesh from where they migrated to the northern part of Tamil Nadu in the 16th century where they were granted the village of Chetpet by a local chieftain.

17th century to the present

During the 19th century, the Vadamas along with other Tamil Brahmins made ample use of the opportunities provided by British rule to dominate the civil services, legislature and the judiciary in the Madras Presidency. Throughout the second half of the 19th century and the early 20th century there was intense political rivalry between the Vadamas and the Brahacharanams for the domination of Brahmin villages called agraharams.

Traditional occupation

They are held to have been the land-lords and head-men of the Brahmin villages called agraharams. Sociologist Andre Beteille, in his thesis Caste, class, and power: changing patterns of stratification in a Tanjore village, describes them as the biggest mirasidars among the Iyer community. They may also have organised the agraharams' defence in turbulent times for though there were not many who joined the army, they were not specifically forbidden to take to arms. 

Many were great scholars and served in the courts of kings. Nilakanta Dikshitar was a minister to Thirumalai Nayak of Madurai.

In the 19th century, as with other Iyers, many of the Vadama joined, the judiciary of British India as lawyers and judges, or served in the Indian Civil and Revenue Services. Many others continued in the service of the kings of the princely states of Travancore, Mysore, Pudukottai, and Ramnad.

Religious practices

The Vadama traditionally claim to be superior to other classes of Iyers. One ritualistic difference from other Iyers, arises in their having to recite the following verse in honour of the River Narmada, and to ward of serpents, as part of their Sandhyavandanam:

Narmadayai namah pratah Narmadayai namo nisi
Namostu Narmade tubhyam pahi mam visa-sarpatah

Also, in some parts of  Kerala, as Nambudiri Brahmacharis were not commonly found, a Brahmachari belonging to the Vadadesa Vadama was required to pour water into the hands of a Nambudiri sanyasi as part of the rituals connected with the latter's breakfast.

Vadamas have also significantly contributed towards popularizing and propagating the worship of Lord Shiva and Devi.

Notables

Religion
Appayya Dikshitar and nephew Neelakanta Deekshitar legendary scholars who re-established Advaita philosophy's predominance in the South belonged to the Vadadesa Vadama sect and migrated from places near Nasik. They were especially patronised by the rulers of Vellore and Madurai, Chinnabomma Nayak and Tirumalai Nayak, respectively.

Sundara Swamigal, a Hindu religious exponent of the mid-19th century and philosophical mentor of the famed Carnatic musician Maha Vaidyanatha Iyer

Swami Sivananda of Divine Life Society, Rishikesh,  a direct descendant of Neelakanta Deekshitar

Politics

 Rama Ramanathan (b. 1964), Member of Legislative Assembly, Tamil Nadu, India (1991–1996).

Military

 Nilakanta Krishnan - Recipient of the Distinguished Service Cross (United Kingdom) for his services to the Royal Indian Navy during the Second world war. Commanded the aircraft carrier,  in the Bay of Bengal during Indo-Pakistani War of 1971: was also the Flag officer commanding for the Eastern Naval Command of the Indian Navy during this war.
 Colonel Ramani Hariharan (b.1936) - Recipient of the Vishisht Seva Medal for his services to the Indian Army,Intelligence Corps. He's a veteran of the 1965 War, 1971 War and Indian Peace Keeping Force
 Colonel Arun Hariharan (b.1969) - A veteran from the Indian Army,Corps of Engineers, Bengal Sappers, senior security and business continuity professional and published Author.

Arts
 Syama Sastri, one of the doyens of Carnatic Music, a descendant of a group of Vadadesa Vadama who fled Conjeeveram in the wake of a Muslim attack.
 Ramaswamy Dikshitar (1735-1817?) and his son Muthuswamy Dikshitar, eminent Carnatic musicians

 Gopalakrishna Bharathi, his father Ramaswami Bharathi and grandfather Kothandarama Bharathi, a family of eminent Carnatic musicians
F.G. Natesa Iyer (1880–1963), founder of Rasika Ranjana Sabha, Trichy, talent scout, officer of the South Indian Railway Company, pioneered modern Tamil drama, Tamil cinema actor, also elected Mayor of Trichy in the 1920s

Notes

References

 

Tamil Brahmins
Smarta tradition
Social groups of Tamil Nadu